Stoke St Mary is a village and civil parish in Somerset, England, situated  south east of Taunton in the Somerset West and Taunton district.

History
The earliest recorded mention of Stoke St Mary is in a Saxon charter dated 854 AD, when a West Saxon king gave the clearly defined lands at ‘Stoc’ to the minster church at Taunton.

The parish of Stoke St Mary was part of the Taunton Deane Hundred.

The Church of St Mary in Stoke St Mary was built in the 13th century and is a simple stone building with battlemented tower. It remains largely unchanged today and the tower is one of the few remaining 13th-century towers in the county.
Agriculture has always been the main occupation in Stoke St Mary but in the 17th century the cloth industry became important in the village and limeburners were common, most working quarries on Stoke Hill. The parish of Stoke St Mary also became famous for its cider and although it is no longer produced in the village, Taunton remains well known for it.
Over the last 20 years the village has changed dramatically with the decline of agriculture and it has become mostly a dormitory village. The village has also grown with the building of new houses, which continues.

Governance
The parish council has responsibility for local issues, including setting an annual precept (local rate) to cover the council’s operating costs and producing annual accounts for public scrutiny. The parish council evaluates local planning applications and works with the local police, district council officers, and neighbourhood watch groups on matters of crime, security, and traffic. The parish council's role also includes initiating projects for the maintenance and repair of parish facilities, as well as consulting with the district council on the maintenance, repair, and improvement of highways, drainage, footpaths, public transport, and street cleaning. Conservation matters (including trees and listed buildings) and environmental issues are also the responsibility of the council.

The village falls within the non-metropolitan district of Somerset West and Taunton, which was established on 1 April 2019. It was previously in the district of Taunton Deane, which was formed on 1 April 1974 under the Local Government Act 1972, and part of Taunton Rural District before that. The district council is responsible for local planning and building control, local roads, council housing, environmental health, markets and fairs, refuse collection and recycling, cemeteries and crematoria, leisure services, parks, and tourism.

Somerset County Council is responsible for running the largest and most expensive local services such as education, social services, libraries, main roads, public transport, policing and  fire services, trading standards, waste disposal and strategic planning.

It is also part of the Taunton Deane county constituency represented in the House of Commons of the Parliament of the United Kingdom. It elects one Member of Parliament (MP) by the first past the post system of election.

Transport
Despite its rural setting, Stoke St Mary is very well connected. It is about a mile from the A358 and only two miles from the M5. The nearest railway station is two miles away in Taunton, which is on the main line between Exeter and Bristol.

Politics
The village is part of the Taunton parliamentary constituency, for which Rebecca Pow (Conservative), who resides in Stoke St Mary, is now M.P. - elected in 2015.

References

External links

Windows Live Local  Aerial photo of the village

Villages in Taunton Deane
Civil parishes in Somerset